Puerto Morín is a Peruvian village and a beach located in Virú District, in La Libertad Region. It is located about 45 km south of Trujillo city. Puerto Morín is located within the jurisdiction of the Municipality of Santa Elena, locality of Virú.

History
The Guañape cove at the end of the nineteenth century, was a beach where people came to fish. It was from the construction of a small dock made by the Frenchman Carlos Marie Morin Dutot with the help of the inhabitants of the place when it acquired its present name of Puerto Morin, Morin Dutot arrived in the country in the 1870s. It is also a starting point to go to Guañape Islands, where there are several species of marine life such as sea lions, birds, etc.

See also

Trujillo
Historic Centre of Trujillo
Chan Chan
Puerto Chicama
Chimú culture
Pacasmayo beach
Marcahuamachuco
Wiracochapampa
Salaverry
Buenos Aires, Trujillo
San Jose Festival
Huanchaco
Moche
Víctor Larco Herrera District
 Vista Alegre
Las Delicias beach
La Libertad Region
Trujillo Province, Peru
Virú culture
Lake Conache
Marinera Festival
Trujillo Spring Festival
Wetlands of Huanchaco

References

External links
 Map of Puerto Morín

Beaches of Peru
Beaches of La Libertad Region
Populated places in La Libertad Region